Rogério Caboclo (born 1973 in São Paulo) is a Brazilian football executive, and President of the Brazilian Football Confederation since 2019.

Career
Rogério Caboclo was elected on 17 April 2018 as the only candidate with 135 votes of 141 possible, to command the highest authority of the Brazilian football for four years, between April 2019 and April 2023. On 6 June 2021, he was dismissed for 30 days, due to reported sexual harassment.

References

1973 births
Living people
People from São Paulo
Presidents of the Brazilian Football Confederation